Matapalo District is one of the four districts of the province Zarumilla in Peru.

References